Fernando Albizu (born 1963) is a Spanish television, film and stage actor.

Biography 
Albizu was born in Vitoria-Gasteiz, Álava, in 1963. Prior to starting a career as an actor, Albizu studied architecture and fashion design and worked as teacher of design and anatomy. Once he moved to Madrid, he came into contact with acting while he was working as costume designer in a cabaret group, beginning to perform in stage thereafter. After 1994, he made his early film performances in short films.

Cast in episodic roles in television series such as Cuéntame, Hospital Central and Mis adorables vecinos, he landed a main role in the sitcom  (2004–2005), playing Manolo, one of siblings of the character played by Emilio Aragón. He starred as the evil Aníbal Torres in the telenovela El auténtico Rodrigo Leal, also featuring in Gominolas, playing a somewhat eccentric gay man and strong fan of the band giving name to the series. His role as Andrés in the film Fat People earned him a Goya award nomination for Best New Actor at age 46. His role as the security guard Román in the 2021 film The Good Boss earned him a nomination for Best Supporting Actor at the 36th Goya Awards.

Filmography

Television

Film

Accolades

References 

1963 births
Living people
Spanish male television actors

Spanish male stage actors
Spanish male film actors
21st-century Spanish male actors